Katerina Joanna Kechris is an American statistician, a professor of biostatistics and informatics in the Colorado School of Public Health, and a regional president of the International Biometric Society. Her research focuses on the use of omics data to study relations between genetics and disease.

Education
Kechris graduated from the University of California, Los Angeles in 1997,
and completed a Ph.D. in statistics at the University of California, Berkeley in 2003. Her dissertation, supervised by Peter J. Bickel, was Statistical Methods for Discovering Features in Molecular Sequences. Before joining the Colorado School of Public Health, she did postdoctoral research with Hao Li at the University of California, San Francisco.

Recognition
Kechris was elected regional president for the Western North American Region of the International Biometric Society in 2018.
She was selected to become a Fellow of the American Statistical Association in 2019, "for contributions to high-dimensional biological data analysis, team science and training and mentoring of students".

References

External links
Home page

Year of birth missing (living people)
Living people
American statisticians
Women statisticians
University of California, Los Angeles alumni
University of California, Berkeley alumni
University of Colorado Denver faculty
Fellows of the American Statistical Association